The Campbell ministry was the combined Cabinet (formally the Executive Council of British Columbia) that governed British Columbia from June 5, 2001, to March 14, 2011. It was led by Gordon Campbell, the 34th premier of British Columbia, and consisted of members of the British Columbia Liberal Party.

The ministry succeeded the Dosanjh ministry, following the results of the 2001 election. The Campbell ministry was in office for the entirety of the 37th Parliament of British Columbia and 38th Parliament of British Columbia, and some of the 39th Parliament of British Columbia before Campbell resigned. It was succeeded by the Christy Clark ministry.

List of ministers

Cabinet composition and shuffles 
Campbell's first cabinet was sworn in on June 5, 2001. At 28 ministers, including Campbell himself, it was the largest cabinet in BC history. 21 members were full ministers and seven were ministers of state, reviving a practice last used in the Vander Zalm ministry. The size came as a surprise, since in the 1996 election, Campbell had run of a promise to reduce the size of cabinet to 12 members. Campbell made significant changes to the structuring of the ministries. Several ministries were divided: Health was split into two ministries, Health Planning and Health Services, and additionally supported by two ministers of state (mental health; intermediate, long-term and home care); Environment was split into Sustainable Resource Management and Water, Land and Air Protection; and Attorney General's responsibility for police and correctional services formed the basis of the new Ministry of Public Safety and Solicitor General. Meanwhile, the ministries for Women's Equality, Multiculturalism, Municipal Affairs and Aboriginal Affairs were merged into the new Ministry of Community, Aboriginal and Women's Services (alongside an additional minister of state for women's equality); and the ministries for Employment and Investment and Small Business, Tourism and Culture were joined together as the new Ministry of Competition, Science and Enterprise.

Campbell initiated his first major shuffle on January 26, 2004. Six ministers were dropped from cabinet — Greg Halsey-Brandt, Gordon Hogg, Ted Nebbeling, Judith Reid, Lynne Stephens and Katherine Whittred — and six new members joined: Pat Bell, Susan Brice, Ida Chong, Tom Christensen, Roger Harris and John Les. Among the ministers who remained in cabinet, Christy Clark moved from education to children and families, Kevin Falcon from deregulation to transport, and Sindi Hawkins from to health planning to intergovernmental affairs. In all, eleven ministers changed portfolios. Additionally, Campbell adjusted the junior ministries. Ministries of state for health planning, deregulation and the Community Charter were eliminated; women's equality and senior care were combined into women's and seniors' services; and new posts were added to oversee forest operations, mining, resort development and immigration and multicultural services. The cabinet remained at 28 ministers.

Following the government's re-election in the 2005 election, Campbell adjusted his cabinet. The cabinet's size was reduced to 23 ministers, in part due to several defeats in the election. Newly-elected MLAs Carole Taylor and Wally Oppal were named finance minister and attorney general, respectively. Colin Hansen moved to economic development, as well as becoming minister responsible for the government's role in the 2010 Olympics; Shirley Bond moved to education; George Abbott moved to health; Rich Coleman moved to forests; and Christensen took on the new portfolio of Aboriginal relations and reconciliation.

On August 15, 2006, Campbell swapped four ministers' portfolios. Stan Hagen moved from children and family development to tourism, sport and arts; Christensen moved from aboriginal relations to children and family development; Mike de Jong moved to aboriginal relations from labour; and Olga Illich moved from tourism to labour. Additionally, Hogg rejoined cabinet as minister of state for ActNow BC.

On June 22, 2008, Campbell shuffled his cabinet in what he called a "mild" change. Colin Hansen returned as finance minister, after Taylor announced she would not run in the next election and was dropped from cabinet. Blair Lekstrom and Bill Bennett joined cabinet from the backbenches, becoming minister of community services and minister of tourism, respectively. Coleman moved from forestry to the new ministry of housing and social development.

Following the 2009 election, Campbell named a new, 24-member cabinet. Hansen remained finance minister and was promoted to deputy premier; de Jong became attorney general; Falcon moved to health services; Bond to transportation; and Abbott to health. Additionally, four members — Linda Reid, Gordie Hogg, Ron Cantelon and Joan McIntyre — were dropped, and eight new members joined cabinet: Randy Hawes (mining), Kash Heed (solicitor general), Mary McNeil (Olympics and ActNow), Margaret MacDiarmid (education), Ben Stewart (citizens' services), Moira Stilwell (advanced education), Steve Thomsom (agriculture), Naomi Yamamoto (intergovernmental relations) and John Yap (climate action).

On April 9, 2010, Heed resigned from cabinet after he learned the RCMP was investigating his campaign for violations of the Elections Act. De Jong stepped in as solicitor general on an interim basis. Heed returned to cabinet on May 4, after being cleared of wrongdoing by the special prosecutor; however, the following day, the special prosecutor himself resigned after it came out that his firm had donated to Heed's campaign. Heed resigned from cabinet again, pending a more thorough investigation, and de Jong again stepped in as solicitor general.

Campbell shuffled his cabinet once more on October 25, 2010. The shuffle came amidst cratering poll numbers. Sixteen members changed portfolios, with only six staying put: Bond (transport), de Jong (attorney general), Hawes (mining), McNeil (citizens' services), Mary Polak (children and family development) and Yap (climate action).

Notes

References

Citations

Sources

Politics of British Columbia
Executive Council of British Columbia
2001 establishments in British Columbia
Cabinets established in 2001
2011 disestablishments in British Columbia
Cabinets disestablished in 2011